Eunidia adlbaueri is a species of beetle in the family Cerambycidae. It was described by Téocchi, Sudre and Jiroux in 2010.

References

Eunidiini
Beetles described in 2010